The 2000–01 Divizia A was the eighty-third season of Divizia A, the top-level football league of Romania. Season began in August 2000 and ended in May 2001. Steaua București was crowned as champion for the 21st time.

Team changes

Relegated
The teams that were relegated to Divizia B at the end of the previous season:
 Farul Constanța
 FC Onești
 CSM Reșița
 Extensiv Craiova

Promoted
The teams that were promoted from Divizia B at the start of the season:
 Foresta Fălticeni
 Gaz Metan Mediaș

Venues

Personnel and kits

League table

Promotion / relegation play-off

Note: FC Baia Mare sold their 2001–02 Divizia A place to FCM Bacău.

Positions by round

Results

Top goalscorers

Champion squad

References

Liga I seasons
Romania
1